Baulu Taung is a mountain of the Tenasserim Hills, Burma.

Geography
Baulu Taung is located southeast of Myinmoletkat Taung, the main Bilauktaung peak, in a wooded and largely uninhabited area of the Tanintharyi Region, 9 km to the west of the border with Thailand. 
The nearest inhabited place is Dathwekyauk, a riverside village located roughly 15 km to the WNW.

See also
List of mountains in Burma

References

Myanmar–Thailand border
Tanintharyi Region
Mountains of Myanmar
Tenasserim Hills